Hypolimnas salmacis, the blue diadem, is a butterfly in the family Nymphalidae. It is found in Sierra Leone, Liberia, Ivory Coast, Ghana, Togo, Benin, Nigeria, Cameroon, Gabon, the Republic of the Congo, Angola, Equatorial Guinea, São Tomé and Príncipe, the DRC, Uganda, Sudan, Ethiopia, Kenya and Tanzania. The habitat consists of secondary forests and disturbed environments.

Adult males mud-puddle. Both sexes feed from teak flowers. There are two female forms, one with blue and the other with an ochreous ground-colour.

The larvae feed on Urera hypselodendron, U. trinervis and Fleurya species.

Subspecies
Hypolimnas salmacis salmacis (Sierra Leone, Liberia, Ivory Coast, Ghana, Togo, Benin, Nigeria, Cameroon, Gabon, Congo, Angola: Cabinda, Democratic Republic of the Congo, Uganda: west to the Bwamba Valley)
Hypolimnas salmacis insularis Schultze, 1920 (Bioko)
Hypolimnas salmacis magnifica Rothschild, 1918 (Uganda, western Kenya, north-western Tanzania)
Hypolimnas salmacis platydema Rothschild & Jordan, 1903 (southern Ethiopia, southern Sudan)
Hypolimnas salmacis thomensis Aurivillius, 1910 (São Tomé)

References

Butterflies described in 1773
salmacis
Butterflies of Africa
Taxa named by Dru Drury